Chhibber (Punjabi: ਛਿੱਬਰ, Hindi: छिब्बर) alternatively Chibber, is a surname of Indian origin. It is the name of a Mohyal Brahmin clan from the Punjab region.

Notable people 

 Gauri Chibber, Indian film producer and designer
 Bhai Mati Das, Sikh martyr who was executed with his brother Sati Das, on the express orders of Emperor Aurangzeb In Front Of Guru Tegh Bahadur Ji
 Bhai Sati Das, Sikh martyr who was executed with his brother Mati Das, on the express orders of Emperor Aurangzeb
Dalima Chhibber, Indian footballer
Bakshi Krishan Nath Chhibber, Indian military veteran and politician.

References

External links 
 Mohyal
 
 Brahman Sikh Ithaas

Surnames
Indian surnames
Hindu surnames
Mohyal clans
Punjabi tribes
Punjabi-language surnames
Social groups of Punjab, India
Social groups of Jammu and Kashmir
Social groups of India